Hartmann's mountain zebra (Equus zebra hartmannae) is a subspecies of the mountain zebra found in far south-western Angola and western Namibia, easily distinguished from other similar zebra species by its dewlap as well as the lack of stripes on its belly.

Habitat and behaviour
They are agile climbers and are able to live in arid conditions and steep mountainous country.

Hartmann's mountain zebras prefer to live in small groups ranging from as little as 3 individuals to as many as 12. Herds will either be a breeding herd comprising one stallion and potentially many mares or it will be a bachelor group and consist primarily of young males. Young males raised as a foal within the breeding herds will generally be sent away in as little as 24 months and they themselves may become the stallion of their own breeding herd in as little as 5 years. When two breeding herds come into contact with one another each respective stallion will engage the other in an elaborate posturing ritual.  

Hartmann's Mountain zebra has been described as an ecosystem engineer, while engaging in their unique dust bathing behavior they create a persistent depression known as a rolling pit. Even after the zebra abandons a rolling pit, they will generally remain visible for many years. These rolling pits appear to provide a favorable microsite for the native vegetation ultimately leading to denser growth throughout the pit.

Description 
Hartmann's mountain zebras have a defining dewlap hanging from their throat and they are striped all the way down to their hooves with white bellies, whereas some other similar looking mountain zebra species only have stripes down to their knees and lack the completely white belly.

Taxonomy
It has been argued that Hartmann's mountain zebra should be considered a separate species from the Cape mountain zebra, but this is not supported by genetic evidence (see Mountain zebra#Taxonomy). Consequently, it is no longer considered a separate species in Mammal Species of the World. 2005.

References 

Hartmann's mountain zebra
Mammals of Angola
Mammals of Namibia
Hartmann's mountain zebra
Articles containing video clips